Ian A. Waitz is the Vice Chancellor at the Massachusetts Institute of Technology, as well as the Jerome C. Hunsaker Professor of Aeronautics and Astronautics. He was a MacVicar Faculty Fellow from 2003 to 2013.

Waitz received his BS in Aerospace Engineering in 1986 from the Pennsylvania State University, his MS in 1988 from George Washington University and his PhD in 1991 from the California Institute of Technology, both in Aeronautics.

References

External links
Biography of Ian A. Waitz
Ian A. Waitz named dean of MIT's School of Engineering

Living people
George Washington University School of Engineering and Applied Science alumni
Penn State College of Engineering  alumni
MIT School of Engineering faculty
Year of birth missing (living people)
California Institute of Technology alumni